Kitsissuarsuit (old spelling: Kitsigsuarssuit) is a settlement in Qeqertalik municipality in western Greenland. The settlement was formerly founded in 1830 as Hunde Ejlande or Dog's Island, although it had already been used as a whaling station since 1817. Its population was 50 in 2020.

Geography 

Transport

Air 

Air Greenland serves the village as part of government contract, with winter-only helicopter flights from Kitsissuarsuit Heliport to Aasiaat Airport. Settlement flights in the Disko Bay region are unique in that they are operated only during winter and spring.

Sea 
During summer and autumn, when the waters of Disko Bay are navigable, communication between settlements is by sea only, serviced by Diskoline. The ferry links Kitsissuarsuit with Aasiaat and Qeqertarsuaq on Disko Island.

Population 
The population of Kitsissuarsuit has decreased by over 37 percent relative to the 1990 levels, and by over 28 percent relative to the 2000 levels.

References 

Disko Bay
Populated places in Greenland
Populated places of Arctic Greenland
Populated places established in 1830
1830 establishments in Greenland